Adoption Act may refer to the short titles of several Acts of Parliament relating to adoption:

Adoption Act 1958 (1958 c.5)
Adoption Act 1960 (1960 c.59)
Adoption Act 1964 (1964 c.57)
Adoption Act 1968 (1968 c.53)
Adoption Act 1976 (1976 c.36)